The Simav barbel (Barbus niluferensis) is a species of ray-finned fish in the genus Barbus, it is found in the southern Marmora basin in Turkey, in the Simav and Gönen drainage systems.

References 

 

N
Fish described in 2009